Paul Sweeney (born 10 January 1965) is a former Scottish professional footballer who played as a defender for Raith Rovers, Newcastle United and St Johnstone.

Club career

Youth career
Sweeney's first football team was Whitfield Star in his hometown of Whitburn.  After playing there, he was signed to Tynecastle.

Club career
He was scouted by Raith Rovers and after a trial period, signed for the club in 1982.  He went on to make 204 appearances for the club and was inducted into the club's hall of fame in 2017.

The defender signed for Newcastle United in 1988 and made his debut against Arsenal at Highbury.

References

1965 births
Living people
Scottish footballers
Scottish Football League players
English Football League players
Association football defenders
Tynecastle F.C. players
Raith Rovers F.C. players
Newcastle United F.C. players
St Johnstone F.C. players
Gateshead F.C. players
Footballers from West Lothian
Hartlepool United F.C. players
Durham City A.F.C. players
Morpeth Town A.F.C. players
South Shields F.C. (1974) players
People from Whitburn, West Lothian